'Quadropus' is the third full-length album by Estradasphere. It was released on October 28, 2003.

For Quadropus, Estradasphere made a conscious decision to isolate the genres for each track, instead of including many genres in a single song. For example, "Mekapses Yitonisa" doesn't stray far from its Greek gypsy roots while "Crystal Blue" is purely Beach Boys-esque rock music. For this reason, Quadropus is considered Estradasphere's most accessible album.

The CD is enhanced and contains a video of the song "Body Slam" being performed live and can be accessed by most computers. This video would later be used for the live DVD Passion for Life (at the end of the video it hints that an Estradasphere DVD would be released in February 2004).

Track listing
"Mekapses Yitonisa" – 4:22
"Dubway" – 3:39
"King Krab Battle" – 8:31
"Speck" – 4:34
"Hardball" – 13:40
"A Car Ride In Idealistic Ethiopia (Part 1)" – 5:47
"Crystal Blue" – 3:40
"Jungle Warfare" – 5:42
"Body Slam" – 3:09
"At Least We'd Have Today" – 9:40

Album credits

The band
Timb Harris – violin, viola, trumpet, guitar, mandolin, Turkish mandolin, vocals, percussion
Jason Schimmel – guitars (electric, acoustic, baritone), banjo, organ, piano, synths, harpsichord, vocals, percussion, beatboxing
Tim Smolens – bass (electric, upright), bari guitar, piano, synths, violin/viola/cello, vocals, percussion
John Whooley – saxophones, flute, vocals, beatboxing, organ

Additional musicians
String quartet on "At Least We'd Have Today" and "Speck"
Violins – Timb and Ben Blechman
Viola – Sarah Hart
Cello – Aria DiSalvio
Horn section on "King Krab Battle"
Trumpets – Timb, Val Hall, Richard Karst
Trombone – Scott Harris
Bass trombone – Luke Kirley
Saxes – John Whooley, Joel Ford, Scott Norgren, Paul Tarantino, Wes Anthony
Tuba – John Thomas

Album Personnel
Produced by Tim Smolens with help from Jason Schimmel except for:
"Speck" – produced by Jason Schimmel
"Dubway" – produced by Andrew Kapner
Recorded mostly in our living rooms (George's too), plus Bear Creek Studios, Pine Forest studios, CC's recording studio and Angelhouse Studios
Engineered by Tim Smolens, Jason Schimmel, Chris Parsons and Trey Spruance
Mixed by Tim Smolens, Timb Harris and Jason Schimmel
"Dubway" mixed by Andrew Kapner
"Bodyslam" mixed by Chris Parsons
"Jungle Warfare" and "Speck" mixed by Trey Spruance
Additional engineering by Chris Parsons
Artwork and layout by Mike Bennewitz

Dedication
Quadropus was created in loving memory of Mary Aquinas McClafferty Whooley and John Patrick Whooley Sr.

Song information

Mekapses Yitonisa
Composition – Greek traditional
Arranged and transcribed by Tim and Timb
Drums – Dave Murray
Dombeks and percussion – Mike Shannon

Dubway
Composition – Estradasphere
Acapellarrangement – John and Jason

Trivia
Absolutely no keyboards, drum machines, guitars or bass were used in the recording of this song.
A live music video for the song is included on the DVD of Passion for Life.

King Krab Battle
Composition – Iron Chef Whooley
Horn arrangement by John and Tim
Drums – Theo Mordey

Speck
Composition – Schimmel
Lyrics by Schimmel, Smolens
Lead vocals – Jason
String arrangement by Trey Spruance
Piano – Jeff Attridge
Drums – Theo Mordey

Hardball
Composition – Schimmel, Whooley, Harris
Drums – Theo Mordey
Percussion – Doug Smolens

A Car Ride in Idealistic Ethiopia (Part 1)
Composition – Smolens
Drums – Dave Murray

Crystal Blue
Composition – Whooley
Lead vocals – John
Organ and piano – Dale Ockerman
Drums and tambourine – Mike Shannon

Jungle Warfare
Composition – Schimmel, Smolens
Lyrics by Dave Murray
Vocals – Dave Murray and Youri Raymond of Unhuman
Drums – John Merryman of Cephalic Carnage
Guitar solo – Kevin Kmetz

Bodyslam
Composition – Estradasphere, Dave Murray
Lyrics and lead vocals – John
Drums – Dave

At Least We'd Have Today
Composition – Smolens
Lead vocals – Tim
Vocal bridge – Joel Robinow

Estradasphere albums
2003 albums